Manthira Punnagai is a 1986 Indian Tamil-language film directed by V. Thamizhazhagan in his debut; he co-produced with G. Thyagarajan. The film stars Sathyaraj and Nadhiya, with Raghuvaran, Baby Sujitha, Thengai Srinivasan, Senthil, Jai Jagadish, Bob Christo and V. S. Raghavan in supporting roles. It was released on 11 December 1986.

Plot

Cast 
 Sathyaraj as the police officer and the doctor
 Nadhiya
 Raghuvaran as Dhairiyaraj
 Baby Sujitha
 Thengai Srinivasan
 Senthil
 Jai Jagadish
 Bob Christo
 V. S. Raghavan

Production 
Manthira Punnagai is the directorial debut of V. Thamizhazhagan.

Soundtrack 
The music was composed by Ilaiyaraaja.

Release and reception 
Manthira Punnagai was released on 11 December 1986, and distributed by Metro Movies. Jayamanmadhan of Kalki unfavourably reviewed the film but praised the music and said since Thamizhazhagan overly desired to give a lot in his debut film, Manthira Punnagai became a Mandha Punnagai (dull smile) full of yawns and concluded "Better luck next time!".

References

External links 
 

1980s Tamil-language films
1986 directorial debut films
Films scored by Ilaiyaraaja